The Worshipful Company of Farmers is one of the Livery Companies of the City of London. The Company became a Livery Company in 1952, and was granted a Royal Charter three years later. The Farmers' Company supports farming students, and otherwise promotes education in agriculture.

The Farmers' Company ranks eightieth in the order of precedence for Livery Companies. Its motto is Give Us Our Daily Bread.

External links
 The Worshipful Company of Farmers

Farmers
1952 establishments in England